István Énekes (20 February 1911 – 2 January 1940) was a Hungarian boxer who competed in the 1932 Summer Olympics.

Background
In 1932 he won the gold medal in the Flyweight class after winning the final against Francisco Cabañas of Mexico. He won twice the gold medal at the 1930 European Amateur Boxing Championships and 1934 European Amateur Boxing Championships, both in Budapest, respectively in the flyweight and bantamweight classes. He was born in and died in Budapest.

István was the elder brother of Vilmos Énekes.

Olympic record
Below is the complete Olympic boxing record for István Énekes, who competed for Hungary in the flyweight division of the 1932 Olympic Games in Los Angeles:

 Round of 16: defeated Gaston Fayaud of France by decision
 Quarterfinal: defeated Edelweis Rodriguez of Italy by decision
 Semifinal: defeated Louis Salica of the United States by decision
 Final: defeated Francisco Cabañas of Mexico by decision (won gold medal)

References
 profile

1911 births
1940 suicides
Flyweight boxers
Olympic boxers of Hungary
Boxers at the 1932 Summer Olympics
Olympic gold medalists for Hungary
Martial artists from Budapest
Olympic medalists in boxing
Hungarian male boxers
Suicides in Hungary
Medalists at the 1932 Summer Olympics
20th-century Hungarian people